Lucas Family Cemetery is a historic plantation cemetery located near Mount Pleasant, Charleston County, South Carolina. It was established in 1825, and the walled plot includes several grave markers signed by Charleston carvers. Eleven gravemarkers remain, dating from 1825 to 1892, and five are brick box tombs with slab or table tops. The cemetery is significant for being a rare example of traditional family cemetery arrangement in the lowcountry.

The cemetery was listed on the National Register of Historic Places in 1998.

References

External links
 

Cemeteries on the National Register of Historic Places in South Carolina
1825 establishments in South Carolina
National Register of Historic Places in Charleston County, South Carolina
Mount Pleasant, South Carolina